Calosoma latipennis is a species of ground beetle in the subfamily of Carabinae. It was described by George Henry Horn in 1870.

References

latipennis
Beetles described in 1870